Edward Eladio Manibusan is a Northern Marianan politician serving as the Attorney General of the Northern Mariana Islands since January 12, 2015 and previously from July 1, 1989 to January 8, 1990. He is the first elected attorney general; previous AGs were appointed by the governor.

Manibusan was elected in 2014, defeating attorney Michael Evangelista by about a two to one margin.  He was reelected in 2018, without opposition.

Before he was elected Attorney General, Manibusan was the head of the Northern Mariana Islands Department of Public Safety, the appointed Attorney General from 1989 to 1990, an Associate Judge of the Superior Court of the Commonwealth of the Northern Mariana Islands from February 1993 to July 1998,
the Presiding Judge of the NMI Superior Court from July 1998 to March 2003, and an attorney in solo private practice.  Prior to the election he also held an honorary appointment as the Civilian Aide to the United States Secretary of the Army for the CNMI.

From 2012 to 2014 he was the chairman of the CNMI Democratic Party. In that capacity he worked to rebuild ties with the Democratic National Committee, and ensure the party ran a gubernatorial candidate in the 2014 election, after it failed to do so in 2009.

In 2022, Manibusan defeated former judge Juan Tudela Lizama by approximately ten points to be reelected Attorney General.

References

External links
Official Biography at the National Association of Attorneys General

|-

|-

1953 births
21st-century American politicians
Attorneys General of the Northern Mariana Islands
Chamorro people
Democratic Party (Northern Mariana Islands) politicians
Gonzaga University School of Law alumni
Living people
Northern Mariana Islands judges
Northern Mariana Islands lawyers
People from Saipan